Anthony Colin Gerald Andrews (born 12 January 1948) is an English actor.  He played Lord Sebastian Flyte in the ITV miniseries Brideshead Revisited (1981), for which he won Golden Globe and BAFTA television awards, and was nominated for an Emmy. His other lead roles include Operation Daybreak (1975), Danger UXB (1979), Ivanhoe (1982) and The Scarlet Pimpernel (1982), and he played UK Prime Minister Stanley Baldwin in The King's Speech (2010).

Early life and career
Andrews was born in London, the son of Geraldine Agnes (née Cooper), a dancer, and Stanley Thomas Andrews, an arranger and conductor for the BBC. He grew up in North Finchley, London. At the age of eight, he took dancing lessons, making his stage debut as the White Rabbit in a stage adaptation of Lewis Carroll's Alice in Wonderland. He attended the Royal Masonic School for Boys in Bushey, Hertfordshire.

After a series of jobs that included catering, farming and journalism, he secured a position at the Chichester Theatre, where he worked as an assistant stage manager and later as a stand-in producer. In 1968, he auditioned for a production of Alan Bennett's new play, Forty Years On, which featured John Gielgud as the headmaster of a British public school during the First World War period. Andrews was cast as Skinner, one of twenty schoolboys. In 1974 he played Lord Robert, Marquis of Stockbridge in the TV series Upstairs, Downstairs. In 1975 he had a leading role in the Spanish film Las adolescentes (The Adolescents), opposite Koo Stark.

In June 1979, he was cast in the role of Bodie in the ITV series The Professionals. However, after three days of filming, the creator and producer Brian Clemens believed that the chemistry between Andrews and Martin Shaw (Doyle) did not work and that "the pair did not have the required undercurrent of menace to carry off the concept". Lewis Collins replaced Andrews in the part. Following that, in 1979, Andrews was the main star of the ITV television series Danger UXB, in which he played a British bomb disposal officer in the London Blitz. The series first aired in the United Kingdom in 1979 on the ITV network.

His subsequent work includes the leading role of Lord Sebastian Flyte in Brideshead Revisited (1981). In 1982, he won a Golden Globe and BAFTA TV Award for his performance and was nominated for an Emmy Award. In the United States, Andrews is best known for his portrayal of the titular character in the television film Ivanhoe as well as that of Sir Percy Blakeney in the film The Scarlet Pimpernel (both 1982).

He played Professor Higgins in a stage version of My Fair Lady (2003), and Count Fosco in Andrew Lloyd Webber's The Woman in White (2005).

He was the narrator for a 21st anniversary BBC Radio 2 special broadcast of Cameron Mackintosh's musical Les Misérables, sung by the then West End cast at the Mermaid Theatre in London on Sunday 8 October 2006. Andrews appeared as Prime Minister Stanley Baldwin in the film The King's Speech (2010), for which he won a SAG Award along with Helena Bonham Carter, Jennifer Ehle, Colin Firth, Michael Gambon, Derek Jacobi, Guy Pearce, Geoffrey Rush and Timothy Spall.

Personal life
Andrews met actress Georgina Simpson of the Simpsons of Piccadilly department store family and they were married on 1 December 1971. They have three children.

Andrews survived a case of water intoxication in 2003. The condition, also known as hyponatraemia ("low blood sodium"), occurs when sodium ions in the body are diluted so far that nerves are unable to function properly. The condition has symptoms similar to those of dehydration, such as headaches, nausea and cramps. While performing as Henry Higgins in My Fair Lady, Andrews consumed up to eight litres of water a day. He lost consciousness and spent three days in intensive care.

Filmography

Film

Television
{| class="wikitable"
|-
! Year
! Title
! Role
! Notes
|-
| 1968
| The Wednesday Play
| Harry
| Episode: "A Beast with Two Backs"
|-
| rowspan="4"|1972
| Dixon of Dock Green
| Paul Richards
| Episode: "First Offenders"
|-
| Doomwatch
| Carlos
| Episode: "Say Knife, Fat Man"
|-
| Follyfoot
| Lord Beck
| Episode: "The Awakening"
|-
| Thirty-Minute Theatre
| Michael Warren
| Episode: "The Judge's Wife"
|-
| rowspan="3"|1974
| The Fortunes of Nigel
| Sir Nigel Olifaunt
| Mini-series, 5 episodes
|-
| QB VII
| Stephen Kelno
| Mini-series, 2 episodes
|-
| The Pallisers
| Earl of Silverbridge
| Recurring role, 7 episodes
|-
| 1974-1975
| David Copperfield
| Steerforth
| Mini-series, 4 episodes
|-
| 1975
| Upstairs, Downstairs
| Marquis of Stockbridge
| Recurring role, 3 episodes
|-
| rowspan="3"|1976
| The Duchess of Duke Street
| Marcus Carrington
| Episode: "Lottie's Boy"
|-
| rowspan="2"|BBC Play of the Month
| Hon. Alan Howard
| Episode: "French Without Tears"
|-
| Charles Courtley
| Episode: "London Assurance"|-
| rowspan="3"|1977
| Wings| Lieutenant Walker
| Episode: "The Prisoner's Friend"|-
| The Sunday Drama| Harry
| Episode: "A Superstition"|-
| BBC Play of the Month| Horner
| Episode: "The Country Wife"|-
| 1978
| BBC Television Shakespeare| Mercutio
| Episode: "Romeo and Juliet"|-
| 1979
| Danger UXB| Brian Ash
| Series regular, 13 episodes
|-
| rowspan="2"|1981
| The Love Boat| Tony Selkirk
| Recurring role, 3 episodes
|-
| Brideshead Revisited| Sebastian Flyte
| Recurring role, 6 episodes
|-
| 1984
| Play for Today| John Loomis
| Episode: "Z for Zachariah"|-
| 1985
| A.D.| Nero
| Mini-series, 5 episodes
|-
| 1987
| American Playhouse| Johnnie Aysgarth
| Episode: "Suspicion"|-
| rowspan="3"|1989
| A Fine Romance| Michael Trent
| Episode: "Pilot"|-
| Columbo| Elliott Blake
| Episode: "Columbo Goes to the Guillotine"|-
| Nightmare Classics| Dr. Henry Jekyll/Mr. Edward Hyde
| Episode: "Strange Case of Dr Jekyll and Mr Hyde"|-
| rowspan="2"|1992
| Danielle Steel's Jewels| William Whitfield
| Mini-series, 2 episodes
|-
| Screen Two| Christopher Edwardes
| Episode: "The Law Lord"|-
| rowspan="2"|1996
| The Ruth Rendell Mysteries| Luke Crossland
| Episode: "Heartstones"|-
| Tales from the Crypt| Jonathan
| Episode: "About Face"|-
| 1997
| Screen Two| Robin
| Episode: "Mothertime"|-
| 2001
| Love in a Cold Climate| Boy
| Mini-series, 3 episodes
|-
| 2003
| Cambridge Spies| King George VI
| Mini-series, 1 episode
|-
| 2004
| Rosemary & Thyme| Richard Oakley
| Episode: "The Invisible Worm"|-
| 2006
| Agatha Christie's Marple| Tommy Beresford
| Episode: "Agatha Christie's Marple"|-
| 2012
| Birdsong| Colonel Barclay
| Mini-series, 1 episode
|-
| 2015
| The Syndicate| Lord Hazelwood
| Series regular, 6 episodes
|-
| 2020
| The English Game| Lord Kinnaird
| Recurring role, 5 episodes
|-
|}

Theatre

 Producing credits Lost in Siberia (1991)Haunted'' (1995)

Awards and nominations

References

External links 
 

1948 births
20th-century English male actors
21st-century English male actors
Best Actor BAFTA Award (television) winners
Best Miniseries or Television Movie Actor Golden Globe winners
English male film actors
English male stage actors
English male television actors
Living people
Outstanding Performance by a Cast in a Motion Picture Screen Actors Guild Award winners
People educated at the Royal Masonic School for Boys
People from Finchley